Summer Love may refer to:

Film and TV
 Summer Love (1958 film), an American black-and-white musical comedy film
 Summer Love (2001 film), a Turkish drama film
 Summer Love (2006 film), a Polish western written and directed by Piotr Uklański
 Summer Love (2019 film), a Nepalese romance drama film
 Summer Love (TV series), a 2022 Australian TV anthology series

Music 
 "Summer Love" (The Fooo Conspiracy song) (2016)
 "Summer Love" (Justin Timberlake song), 2007
 "Summer Love" (One Direction song), 2012
 "Summer Love" (Sherbet song), 1975
 "Summer Love", a 1957 song by Joni James
 "Summer Love", a 1958 song by Kip Tyler from the soundtrack of Summer Love (1958 film)
 "Summer Love", a 1959 song by Felicia Sanders
 "Summer Love", a 2018 song by Rita Ora from Phoenix

Other 
 Summer Love (novel), a 2012 Nepali novel by Subin Bhattarai
 Brides in Love, the Charlton Comics series retitled Summer Love for its final three issues

See also
 Summer of Love (disambiguation)
 "Summer Time Love", a 2006 song by M-Flo
 "My Summer Love", a 1963 hit by Ruby & the Romantics
 Summer Lovers, a 1982 American film